Gatōken Shunshi (画登軒 春芝) was a designer of ukiyo-e Japanese woodblock prints in Osaka who was active from about 1820 to 1828.  He was a student of Shunkōsai Hokushū and the teacher of Gakōken Shunshi.  Gatōken Shunshi is best known for his portraits of the kabuki actors, especially the star Onoe Tamizō II.

Other artists names Shunshi

There are three other, less well known, ukiyo-e artists called “Shunshi” in English, although each is written with different kanji:
春子 Seiyōsai Shunshi, also known as Shun’yōsai Shunshi, active 1826–8.  Possibly an early name of Hokumyō.
春枝 Gakōken Shunshi, a student of Gatōken Shunshi, active in the mid-1820s
春始 a student of Gatōken Shunshi, active in the 1830s

Notes

References
Keyes, Roger S. & Keiko Mizushima, The Theatrical World of Osaka Prints, Philadelphia, Philadelphia Museum of Art, 1973, 276.
Lane, Richard. (1978).  Images from the Floating World, The Japanese Print. Oxford: Oxford University Press. ;  OCLC 5246796
Newland, Amy Reigle, The Hotei Encyclopedia of Japanese Woodblock Prints, Amsterdam, Hotei Publishing, 2005, Vol. 2, 488.
Roberts, Laurance P., A Dictionary of Japanese Artists, Tokyo, Weatherhill, 1976, 157.

Ukiyo-e artists
Japanese printmakers
19th-century Japanese people
19th-century Japanese artists
20th-century Japanese artists
20th-century printmakers